The Root-Tilden-Kern Scholarship is a full-tuition public service scholarship for students at New York University School of Law. It is widely considered to be the most prestigious public interest scholarship for law students in the United States.

The program
The Root-Tilden-Kern Program looks for students with a demonstrated commitment to the public interest, exceptional leadership ability, and a history of academic achievement. In assessing these criteria, the program looks at the whole person and considers previous life experience and professional work. The program values diversity and strives to select a class that is diverse in terms of race, sex, class, ethnicity, sexual orientation, geographic origins, and ideology. Interested candidates should submit an application with their application to New York University School of Law. The application is reviewed by a student and faculty committee before recommendation for an interview. Each year, approximately 50 applicants are invited to interview with a panel composed of a faculty member, a judge, a practitioner and third-year scholars. Twenty scholars are selected for each incoming class. Scholars are expected to work in public service for a minimum of five years after graduation or the completion of judicial clerkships.

History
In the 1950s, Dean Emeritus Arthur Vanderbilt conceived of the Root-Tilden Scholarship to transform NYU from a local law school to a nationally and internationally esteemed institution. Founded in 1951, the purpose of the program was to “train promising young men so as to help attain again for the American bar the high position which it once held as the reservoir of altruistic and competent public leadership.” 

The program was named for two alumni, Elihu Root and Samuel Tilden, who exemplified Vanderbilt's ideal – lawyers dedicated to public leadership. Twenty scholars were selected for the first class from each of the country's then ten judicial circuits. Scholars were at first required to take special courses in the humanities, social sciences, history and natural sciences and required to live together and share mealtimes five days a week. Scholars met with leaders in government, industry and finance. In 1969, after a campaign by student groups, the first women were admitted to the Root Program. To date, more than 800 Root-Tilden Scholars have graduated from NYU School of Law.

In 1998, then Dean John Sexton announced a precedent-setting gift of $5 million from an alumnus of the Root-Tilden Scholarship, Jerome H. Kern (class of 1960), that began a major capital campaign to raise $30 million for the program. To honor Kern's generous contribution, the Law School renamed the program as the Root-Tilden-Kern Scholarship Program. Kern is the chairman of Symphony Media Systems, LLC, and was formerly a senior partner of the law firm Baker & Botts. In 2004, under the leadership of Dean Richard Revesz, the Law School successfully completed its campaign goal of $30 million and now offers full-tuition scholarships to 20 students each year.

Notable scholars
 Jonathan S. Abady, 1990, founding partner, Emery Celli Brinckerhoff & Abady LLP
Daniel Abrahamson, 1991, director of legal affairs, Drug Policy Alliance
 Jane Aiken, 1983, professor, Georgetown University Law Center
 Lamar Alexander, 1965, U.S. Senator (R-Tennessee)
 Mary Anderson, 1998, Chief of Policy and Special Counsel, Office of Illinois Attorney General
 Vicki Been, 1983, New York City Deputy Mayor of Housing and Economic Development
 Jeremy Ben-Ami, 1990, executive director, J Street
 Pasco Middleton Bowman II, senior judge, U.S. Court of Appeals for the Eighth Circuit
 Julie Brill, 1985, commissioner, Federal Trade Commission
 Murray Bring, 1959, former general counsel, Philip Morris, former Clerk, Earl Warren
 Thomas Buergenthal, 1960, judge, International Court of Justice
 Derwyn Bunton, 1998, chief public defender, Orleans Public Defenders Office
 Hamilton Candee, 1983, of counsel, Altshuler Berzon LLP
 Zama Coursen-Neff, 1998, deputy director, Human Rights Watch
 Arthur B. Culvahouse, Jr., 1973, partner, O'Melveny & Myers LLP
 Benjamin F. Crane, 1954, partner, Cravath Swaine & Moore 
 Diana DeGette, 1982, U.S. House of Representatives (D-Colorado)
 Steve C. Dune, 1957, partner at Cadwalader, Wickersham & Taft
 Donald Elliott, 1957, chairman, City Planning Commission
 Jim Exum, 1960, former Chief Justice, Supreme Court of North Carolina
 Elaine Fink, 1980, managing attorney, Legal Aid Society of Cincinnati 
 Anthony Foxx, 1996, Secretary of Transportation, U.S. Department of Transportation
 Karen Freedman, 1980, executive director, Lawyers for Children
 Margaret Fung, 1978, executive director, Asian American Legal Defense and Education Fund
 Michael Gerrard, 1978, professor at Columbia Law School, partner of Arnold & Porter
 John Greaney, 1963, associate justice, Massachusetts Supreme Court
 Keith Harper, 1994, partner in Kilpatrick Stockton and judge of several Native American nations
 Seth Harris, 1990, deputy secretary, U.S. Department of Labor
 Mary Haviland, 1994, commissioner of the New York State Crime Victims Board
 Steven W. Hawkins, 1988, executive vice-president, NAACP
 Sharon Kang Hom, executive director, Human Rights in China
 Richard Joel, president, Yeshiva University
 Herbert Kelleher, co-founder and former chairman and CEO of Southwest Airlines
 Jerome Kern, 1960, senior partner at Baker & Botts and Vice-Chair of TCI Telecommunications
 Peter Koneazny, 1983, litigation director, Legal Aid Society of Milwaukee
 Dorchen Leidholdt, 1988, legal director, Sanctuary for Families
 Douglas Liebhafsky, 1964, partner at Wachtell, Lipton, Rosen & Katz and Special ADA for New York County (Manhattan)
 Martin Lipton, 1954, founding partner, Wachtell, Lipton, Rosen, and Katz
 Oscar Londoño, 2017, Executive Director, WeCount!
 Nancy Lublin, 2001, creator of Dress for Success and CEO of Do Something
 Nancy Mahon, 1989, Senior Vice President of MAC Cosmetics and Executive Director of MAC AIDS Fund
 Susan Malveaux, professor of law, Catholic University of America
 Felicia A. Marcus, 1983, Western Director, National Resources Defense Council
 Bridget McCormack, Michigan Supreme Court Justice; professor of law; founder and co-director of the Michigan Innocence Clinic at the University of Michigan Law School
 Doug McFarland, professor, Hamline University and former U.S. Senate Candidate from Minnesota
 Christopher Meade, 1996, principal deputy general counsel, U.S. Department of Treasury
 Roger M. Milgrim, 1961, author, Milgrim on Trade Secrets and Milgrim on Licensing
 James Milliken, president, University of Nebraska
 Nina Morrison, 1998, senior staff attorney, Innocence Project
 Wayne Outten, 1974, founding partner, Outten & Golden, LLP
 Geri Palast, 1976, executive director, Campaign for Fiscal Equality
 Peter Pitegoff, dean, University of Maine Law School
 Stewart G. Pollock, 1957, former New Jersey Supreme Court Justice
 Connie Rice, civil rights activist, co-founder of Advancement Project
 Dennis Riordan, 1974, partner at Riordan & Horgan
 Jenny Rivera, 1985, Associate Judge of the Court of Appeals, State of New York
 Lourdes Rosado, 1995, Program Director, New York Civil Liberties Union
 Janet Sabel, 1984, general counsel, Legal Aid Society of New York
 Michael Sarbanes, 1992, executive director, Citizens Planning and Housing Association
 Andrew Siegel, 1999, associate professor of law, Seattle University
 Tanya Southerland Narcel, 2000, Resident Country Director of Millennium Challenge Corporation
 Susan J. Sutherland, 1982, senior partner, Skadden, Arps, Slate, Meagher & Flom
 Herbert Wachtell, 1954, founding partner, Wachtell, Lipton, Rosen, and Katz
 Jenny R. Yang, 1996, Commissioner of the US Equal Employment Opportunity Commission

References

New York University School of Law
Scholarships in the United States